Kaushik Jamnadas Patel is an Indian politician from Gujarat. A former revenue minister, Patel was a member of the Gujarat Legislative Assembly from Dariapur (Ahmedabad) in 1995, 1998 and 2002. He is a trusted associate of party chief Amit Shah, having contested from Naranpur constituency which was vacated by Amit Shah.

See also
 Nimaben Acharya
 Hemaben Acharya
 Suryakant Acharya

References

Living people
Year of birth missing (living people)
Gujarat MLAs 1995–1998
Gujarat MLAs 1998–2002
Gujarat MLAs 2002–2007